Agaram  is a village in Tiruchirappalli taluk of Tiruchirappalli district, Tamil Nadu.

Demographics 

As per the 2001 census, Agaram had a population of 706 with 342 males and 364 females. The sex ratio was 1064 and the literacy rate, 85.81.

References 

 

Villages in Tiruchirappalli district